Sky: Children of the Light (shortened to Sky in-game) is an open world social indie adventure game developed and published by Thatgamecompany. It was first released for iOS on July 18, 2019. An Android version was later released on April 7, 2020, and a Nintendo Switch version was released on June 29, 2021, followed by a PlayStation 4 release on December 6, 2022.

Gameplay
In Sky, players explore a once-prosperous kingdom using a cape that allows them to fly. The in-game world consists of seven unique realms, each with a variety of areas to explore, and a theme representing different stages of life. There is also Home, a small island which serves as the world hub and the starting point for the player. Throughout the world, players encounter "spirits" that allow them to unlock items in return for in-game currency, and "children of light" that give players "winged light." When a player has collected enough winged light, their cape level goes up, allowing them to fly farther.

The game places heavy focus on social mechanics. Players are able to meet and befriend one another, and can unlock new abilities such as chat and sending gifts as their friendship grows. There are also many cosmetic items to collect including capes, masks, hairstyles, hats, pants, playable musical instruments, expressions, and more. These items can be obtained using in-game currency or, in some cases, purchased with real life money. Some cosmetics are only available to select players, such as the original beta cape, only available to those who played the beta version prior to the full release of the game.

Sky has multiple in-game currencies. "Candles" are the main currency of Sky, and are exchanged with spirits and friends in return for items and abilities. Candles are obtained by collecting pieces of light (called wax in game) and forging them, or by purchasing them for real money. "Hearts" are the social currency of Sky, and are obtained when players receive gifts from others, or can be bought directly from spirits with candles. Hearts are primarily used to purchase cosmetic items from spirits. "Ascended candles" are the rarest currency in Sky, which are rewarded to players for giving their winged light to "The fallen" at the end of the game. Ascended candles are exchanged with spirits for "wing buffs," which give players extra Winged Light, or can be used to upgrade friendship and purchase various spells such as height alteration and cape recharge.

Realms 
The setting consists of seven unique realms, in addition to Home, the starting point of the game.

Home 
Home is where any newcomers will begin the game, as well as being a central hub for the rest of the game. One of the key features of Home is the ability to use doorways known as "portals" to select a stage to arrive in. The portals start out dormant, each one activating linearly. After enough progress is made, the levels becomes more open-ended, allowing access to the different realms regardless of the initial order. The only exception to this rule is the Eye of Eden, which, alongside the requirement of the other six realms being played through, can't be entered until twenty winged lights are collected. When players walk into a portal, it automatically transports them to the beginning of the corresponding area, regardless of previous progress. There is a small circle dubbed the Return Shrine, which will send the player to the realm they were last in.

Home also contains the constellation table. Any spirits that are saved in the other realms are displayed in their realm's constellation. When the constellation of a spirit is selected, hearts and candles can be spent to unlock new items. These include spells, leveled-up expressions, and customization options. Another feature of the Constellation Table is the Friend Constellations, for viewing other players that were added to the friend list, allowing the players to give and receive gifts, and joining servers to play together.

Other features of Home include closet space to change cosmetics, a bell that chimes every hour and quarter hour, and a boat called the Sleepy Traveling Merchant's Boat, occasionally arriving to give the player free spells and sell season exclusive items.

At the starting point of each realm there is a small hub with gravestones of the spirits you find, closets (which are not present in the Vault of Knowledge), and a portal to return Home.

Seasons and events
Sky features ongoing seasonal events, with new storylines and unique spirits and items. Seasonal events are completely free-to-play, but some of the spirits' items require a paid "Adventure Pass" to unlock. The seasons have a unique currency called "seasonal candles," which can be used to purchase seasonal items and are converted to regular candles when the season ends. Seasonal spirits may return as "Traveling Spirits" in the future, which players can give their candles and hearts to receive seasonal items for a limited time, albeit at a higher price.

Music
Sky features an orchestral score composed by Vincent Diamante, with some tracks performed by FAME'S Macedonian Symphonic Orchestra. Norwegian singer Aurora also provides the vocals for the game's intro and outro songs.

Three volumes of soundtrack albums have been released. The first volume covers more recognizable music from the base game cycle. The second volume contains mostly ambient background music, and the third includes various pieces composed for Sky'''s Seasonal Events.

Charity
In 2020, Thatgamecompany held some in-game events in support of charity. First was the "Days of Nature" event, in celebration of Earth Day, during which a unique IAP (in-app purchase) was available. Proceeds from each purchase of the IAP were used to plant one tree per purchase, in partnership with the OneTreePlanted charity. This event resulted in a total of 40,576 trees planted across the Amazonian and Australian forests damaged by wildfires. In April 2021, Sky hosted its second "Days of Nature" event, using the game to promoting awareness towards plastic pollution of the ocean.

In May 2020, Thatgamecompany hosted a "Days of Healing" event to help raise money for the Médecins Sans Frontières organization, leading Thatgamecompany to donate $719,138 to the MSF COVID-19 Crisis Fund. For the event, Thatgamecompany also joined the World Health Organization's #PlayApartTogether campaign.

In June 2020, Sky held its first "Days of Rainbow" event, featuring colorful rainbow items and spells as a way to celebrate pride month. The second "Days of Rainbow" event the following year gathered funds for The Trevor Project and the Global Fund for Women, with players raising $794,420 in total.

Reception

Review aggregator Metacritic awarded the game an 82 out of 100 based on 18 reviewers, as well as awarding it the number one shared iOS game of 2019, number three most discussed iOS game of 2019, and number 13 best iOS game of 2019.Game Informer scored the game an 8.5 out of 10 stating "Sky is a refreshingly moving and robust game on the iOS platform, and one best shared with others – especially folks who might not normally pick up a video game." GameSpot scored the game an 8 out of 10, giving exceptional praise to the visuals, animations and musical scores, however admitting that "return visits to previous environments aren't nearly as captivating as your first trip." IGN scored the game an 8.5 out of 10, likening the game to its predecessor as "a bigger and bolder follow-up that expands on what made Journey so great." Destructoid, like many other reviewers praised how it's a game that "most everyone should experience", was however highly critical of the touch controls and the lack of control it gave of your character, going as far to suggest that "most everyone should wait for a console or PC release" to play the game. Nintendo Life'' scored the Switch version 8 out of 10, sharing the same praise as other reviewers, though highlighting that the simplistic gameplay may not keep players engaged in the long term, and how the option to toggle the FPS from 60 to 30 is objectively worse and provides only minor improvements.

Accolades
The game won Apple's iPhone game of the year for 2019. On October 5, 2020, Gamasutra reported that the game had topped 50 million downloads worldwide.

Animated adaptation
On March 27, 2022, during AnimeJapan 2022, an animated project was announced.

References

External links
 

2019 video games
Adventure games
Android (operating system) games
Apple Design Awards recipients
Art games
Fantasy video games
Indie video games
IOS games
Multiplayer and single-player video games
PlayStation 4 games
Nintendo Switch games
Thatgamecompany
Video games developed in the United States
Video games postponed due to the COVID-19 pandemic
Works based on The Little Prince
Game Developers Choice Award winners
Webby Award winners